Noble Park railway station is located on the Pakenham and Cranbourne lines in Victoria, Australia. It serves the south-eastern Melbourne suburb of Noble Park, and opened on 3 February 1913.

History
Noble Park station, like the suburb itself, is named after Noble Buckley, the son of Allan Buckley, who is recognised as the founder of the suburb.

In 1927, the station was closed to goods traffic. In 1954, flashing light signals were provided at the former Heatherton Road level crossing, which was located near the station in the up direction.

In 1972, new ground-level station buildings were provided, after the original station building on Platform 1 had been destroyed by an arsonist on 22 August 1970. In 1977, boom barriers were provided at the former Heatherton Road level crossing.

In 2007, minor upgrade works were carried out to the station as part of the EastLink project. The upgrades including improved shelter, car parking and better security, including brighter lighting and better CCTV coverage.

In 2015, the Level Crossing Removal Authority announced the grade separation of the Heatherton Road level crossing, with construction beginning in 2016. The final scheme involved elevating the line over Corrigan, Heatherton and Chandler Roads, including a new high-level station, which opened on 15 February 2018. A row of shops now occupies the site of the original station buildings.

Platforms and services
Noble Park has one island platform with two faces. It is served by Pakenham and Cranbourne line trains.

Platform 1:
  all stations and limited express services to Flinders Street
  all stations and limited express services to Flinders Street

Platform 2:
  all stations and limited express services to Pakenham
  all stations services to Cranbourne

Future services:
In addition to the current services the Network Development Plan Metropolitan Rail proposes linking the Pakenham and Cranbourne lines to both the Sunbury line and under-construction Melbourne Airport rail link via the Metro Tunnel.
  express services to West Footscray and Sunbury (2025 onwards)
  express services to Melbourne Airport (2029 onwards)

Transport links
Ventura Bus Lines operates three routes via Noble Park station, under contract to Public Transport Victoria:
 : to Mordialloc station
 : Dandenong station – Brighton
 : to Dandenong station

Noble Park station is connected to the Djerring Trail (Caufield–Dandenong Rail Trail), a shared walking and cycling path, which was completed in 2018. Locked bike storage is also available at the station.

Gallery

References

External links
 
 Melway map at street-directory.com.au

Premium Melbourne railway stations
Railway stations in Melbourne
Railway stations in Australia opened in 1913
Railway stations in the City of Greater Dandenong